Mat Sinner (born Matthias Lasch; 16 October 1964 in Stuttgart, West Germany) is a bassist, vocalist, and record producer from Stuttgart, Germany. 

Sinner has been involved in numerous bands and projects throughout his musical career. His main bands have been Sinner since 1982 and Primal Fear since 1997; he formed the latter band with former Gamma Ray singer Ralf Scheepers. He also formed the band Voodoo Circle with guitarist Alex Beyrodt, in 2008.

Sinner has also been working as a record producer for Kiske/Somerville, Bobby Kimball/Jimi Jamison (former vocalists of bands Toto and Survivor), and the first Scheepers solo album. Sinner is also the musical director of the successful Rock Meets Classic tour in Europe, where legendary rock singers team up with the RMC Symphony Orchestra and the Mat Sinner Band every year with a setlist of classic rock songs. 

In 2013 Sinner also joined the band Silent Force.

In 2014, it was announced that a new project called Level 10, featuring Sinner with Symphony X vocalist Russell Allen and other members of Primal Fear. In January 2015 Chapter One was released.

In 2017, Mat Sinner released the album Tequila Suicide with his band Sinner with a Top 50 chart entry in Germany. The Primal Fear album Apocalypse released in August 2018 and charted Top 10 in Germany and 11 more countries. The Sinner album Santa Muerte released on 13 September 2019 and the Primal Fear album Metal Commando was released on 24 July 2020.

Discography

Sinner 
Danger Zone (1984)
Touch of Sin (1985)
Comin' Out Fighting (1986)
Dangerous Charm (1987)
No More Alibis (1992)
Respect (1994)
Bottom Line (1995)
Judgement Day (1997)
The Nature of Evil (1998)
The End of Sanctuary (2000)
There Will Be Execution (2004)
Mask of Sanity (2007)
Crash & Burn (2008)
One Bullet Left (2011)
Touch of Sin 2 (2013)
Tequila Suicide (2017)
Santa Muerte (2019)

Solo 
Back to the Bullet (1990)

Primal Fear 
Primal Fear (1998)
Jaws of Death (1999)
Nuclear Fire (2001)
Horrorscope (EP) (2002)
Black Sun (2002)
Devil's Ground (2004)
Seven Seals (2005)
New Religion (2007)
16.6 (2009)
Unbreakable (2012)
Delivering the Black (2014)
Rulebreaker (2016)
Apocalypse (2018)
Metal Commando (2020)

Kiske/Somerville 
Kiske/Somerville (2010)
City of Heroes (2015)

Voodoo Circle 
Voodoo Circle (2008)
Broken Heart Syndrome (2011)
More Than One Way Home (2013)
Whisky Fingers (2015)
Raised on Rock (2018)
 Locked & Loaded (2021)

Ralf Scheepers 
Scheepers (2011)

Silent Force 
Rising From Ashes (2013)

Level 10  
 Chapter One (2015)

Other 
The Heat – Same (1993)
Skin Deep – Painful Day (1993)
The Heat – Goldfinger (1995)
Pegazus – Breaking The Chains (1999)
Kovenant – New World Order (2000)
Hammerfall – "Crimson Thunder" (2002)
Rick Renstrom – Rick Renstrom (2004)
Joacim Cans – Beyond the Gates (2004)
Dionysus – Fairytales & Reality (2006)
Tribuzy – Execution (2006)
Vengeance – Back in the Ring (2006)
Biss – Xtension (2006)
Goddess Shiva – Goddess Shiva (2007)
Tribuzy – Execution – Live Reunion (2007)
Barra Bazz – Barra Bazz (2008)
Vengeance – Soul Collector (2009)
Phenomena – Blind Faith (2010)
Kimball/Jamison – Kimball Jamison (2011)
Jorn - Life On Death Road (2017)

References

Primal Fear

External links
Mat Sinner
Mat Sinner Official
Primal Fear
Frontiers Records
Nuclear Blast

German heavy metal bass guitarists
Male bass guitarists
German heavy metal singers
German male singers
Living people
Musicians from Stuttgart
Sinner (band) members
Primal Fear (band) members
Silent Force members
1964 births
German male guitarists